The 1909–10 season was the 18th in the history of the Western Football League.

After Division One was scrapped at the end of the previous season, the members clubs all having resigned to concentrate on the Southern League, the Western League became a single-division league for the first time since the inaugural 1892–93 season. The champions were Treharris, the first time that the title had been won by a Welsh team, although they left the league at the end of the season.

Final table
The old Division Two became the only division for this season, and two new clubs joined, increasing the number of clubs from 12 to 13 clubs, after Staple Hill disbanded.
Merthyr Town
Ton Pentre
Aberdare changed their name to Aberdare Town

References

1909-10
1909–10 in Welsh football
1909–10 in English association football leagues